Acrocercops euargyra is a moth of the family Gracillariidae, known from Java, Indonesia. It was described by Edward Meyrick in 1934.

References

euargyra
Moths of Asia
Moths described in 1934